Wacom or WACOM may refer to:
 Wacom, a Japanese producer of graphics tablets and related products
 WACOM (WAter COmpetences Model), a European educational project
 World Apostolic Congress on Mercy